The Little River is a  stream largely in the town of Exeter in Rockingham County, New Hampshire, United States. It is a tributary of the Exeter River, part of the Great Bay/Piscataqua River watershed in the New Hampshire Seacoast region.

The Little River rises in the northeastern corner of Brentwood and flows east, quickly entering the town limits of Exeter. The river flows southeast through wetlands and past low hills, passing through Colcord Pond just west of the downtown part of Exeter. The river flows into the Exeter River at the southern edge of the campus of Phillips Exeter Academy.

See also

List of rivers of New Hampshire

References

Rivers of New Hampshire
Rivers of Rockingham County, New Hampshire